The Ministry of Works, abbreviated KKR, is a ministry of the Government of Malaysia that is responsible for public works, highway authority, construction industry, engineers, architects and quantity surveyors.

Organisation
Minister of Works
Deputy Minister of Works
Secretary-General
Under the Authority of Secretary-General
Legal Advisor's Office
Internal Audit Unit
Integrity Unit
Corporate Communication Unit
Deputy Secretary-General (Policy and Development)
Highway Planning Division
Policy and International Division
Development and Privatization Division
Facilities Management Division
Deputy Secretary-General (Management)
Human Resources Management Division
Management Services Division
Account Division
Finance Division
Corporate Planning Division
Information Management Division

Federal department
 Malaysian Public Works Department, or Jabatan Kerja Raya Malaysia (JKR). (Official site)

Federal agencies
 Malaysian Highway Authority, or Lembaga Lebuhraya Malaysia (LLM). (Official site)
 Construction Industry Development Board Malaysia (CIDB), or Lembaga Pembangunan Industri Pembinaan Malaysia. (Official site)
 Board of Engineers Malaysia (BEM), or Lembaga Jurutera Malaysia. (Official site)
 Board of Architects Malaysia, or Lembaga Arkitek Malaysia (LAM). (Official site)
 Board of Quantity Surveyors Malaysia (BQSM), or Lembaga Juruukur Bahan Malaysia. (Official site)

Key legislation
The Ministry of Works is responsible for administration of several key acts of parliament.

History
In 1954, the British government took several measures to separate the administration of the Malay Peninsula (Malaya) from its main administration centralised in Singapore. This marked the beginning point where the local government departments in the Malay Peninsula were permitted to implement their own policies and programs respectively. In 1956, the chief minister and several ministers were appointed to lead the Federation of Malay Peninsula.

In the same year, several ministries were formed including the Ministry of Works, which then was originally named the Ministry of Works, Post and Telecom. Sardon bin Haji Jubir was the first minister to lead this ministry. The functions and responsibilities of the Public Works Department were retained and put under the purview of the ministry’s administration. In 1957, the ministry was reorganized and renamed as the Ministry of Works and Transportation.

The rapid progress made in the country's development and socioeconomic condition during the 1970s resulted in the increase of the ministry’s functions and roles. With the addition of the new roles, the Ministry was renamed once more as the Ministry of Works and Public Amenities in 1978. However, in line with the specialisation of responsibilities, the government renamed the ministry as the Ministry of Works Malaysia in the 1980s; the name has remained unchanged as of early 2014.

See also
Minister of Works (Malaysia)

References

External links
 Ministry of Works
 

 
Federal ministries, departments and agencies of Malaysia
Malaysia
Construction in Malaysia
Infrastructure in Malaysia